Community West Bancshares is a registered bank holding company headquartered in California. It wholly owns Community West Bank under the Bank Holding Company Act. The company delivers a wide range of commercial and retail financial services such as various loan and deposit products through the operation of the bank. As of December 31, 2020, the Company had $975.4 million in total assets, $89 million in total stockholders' equity and $766.1 million in deposits.

History
Community West Bank was established in 1989 to provide financial services including relationship banking, mortgage lending and SBA lending.

On November 26, 1996, Community West Bancshares was incorporated as the bank holding company for Community West Bank.

On December 31, 1997, Community West Bancshares completed the acquisition of Goleta National Bank.

On September 1, 2004, the bank changed its name to Community West Bank, also the currently name.

On May 14, 2013, the company declared plans to consolidate the Roseville SBA administrative office functions into the existing loan servicing operations in Goleta.

Leadership
The main managers are listed as follows:
William Peeples - Independent Chairman of the Board
Martin Plourd - President, Chief Executive Officer
Susan Thompson- Chief Financial Officer

References

External links

Banks established in 1989
Holding companies established in 1996
Holding companies of the United States
Banks based in California
Companies listed on the Nasdaq
1996 establishments in California